High Forge is a hamlet in County Durham, England. It is situated a short distance to the west of Urpeth, north of Beamish.

References

Villages in County Durham